Kotok (also Romanized as Kotok) is a village in Lalar and Katak Rural District, Chelo District, Andika County, Khuzestan Province, Iran. At the 2006 census, its population was 638, in 110 families.

References 

Populated places in Andika County